Cost per order, also called cost per purchase, is the cost of internet advertising divided by the number of orders. Cost per order, along with cost per impression and cost per click, is the starting point for assessing the effectiveness of a company's internet advertising and can be used for comparison across advertising media and vehicles and as an indicator of the profitability of a firm's internet marketing.

Purpose

The purpose of the "cost per order" metric is to measure the advertising cost required to acquire an order. If the main purpose of the ad is to generate sales, cost per order is the preferred metric.

Construction

This is the cost to generate an order. The precise form of this cost depends on the industry and is complicated by product returns and multiple sales channels. The basic formula is:

Cost per order ($) = Advertising cost ($) / Orders placed (#)

References

External links 
MASB Official Website

Advertising